Cygnus-X is a massive star formation region located in the constellation of Cygnus at a distance from the Sun of 1.4 kiloparsecs (4,600 light years).

As it is located behind the Cygnus Rift and its light is heavily absorbed by the Milky Way's interstellar dust, it is better studied in other wavelengths of the electromagnetic spectrum that penetrate it such as the infrared.

Physical properties 

As studies done with the help of the Spitzer Space Telescope have shown, Cygnus-X has a size of 200 parsecs and contains the largest number of massive protostars as well as the largest stellar association (Cygnus OB2, with up to 2,600 stars of spectral type OB and a mass of up to 105 solar masses) within a radius of 2 kiloparsecs of the Sun. It is also associated with one of the largest molecular clouds known, with a mass of 3 million solar masses. Its stellar population includes a large number of early-type stars as well as evolved massive stars such as luminous blue variable candidates, Wolf–Rayet stars, and supergiant stars of spectral types O and B.

Ongoing research has shown Cygnus X includes two stellar associations: Cygnus OB2 and Cygnus OB9 as well as an additional large number of early-type stars that include BD+40°4210, a blue supergiant star and luminous blue variable candidate that is one of the brightest stars of the association, as well as more supergiant stars of spectral types O and B. The same study shows that star formation has been taking place there during at least 10 million years, continuing to the present day.

Cygnus OB7 lies in its front.

See also 

 Orion molecular cloud complex
 Taurus Molecular Cloud
 Rho Ophiuchi cloud complex
 Perseus molecular cloud

References 

 What is the Cygnus-X Region?
 Cygnus-X: The Inner Workings of a Nearby Star Factory (APOD: 2012 January 18)
 New members of the massive stellar population in Cygnus

Emission nebulae
Cygnus (constellation)
Star-forming regions
Molecular clouds